Guglielmo Pizzirani (1886 – 1971), was an Italian painter and teacher, belonging to the modernist group Gruppo Moderno Italiano (Modern Italian Group), and active in Bologna, Italy.

Short biography 
Pizzirani attended the Fine Arts Institute of Bologna, and was taught by renowned Italian artists Gorini and Ferri, also collaborating in the restoration and decoration of important city monuments.

From 1909 he concentrated on teaching and also exhibited his work at the three Secessioni Romane (Roman Secessions of 1913-1915), organised by the Roman School. In 1920 Pizzirani began participating in the Biennale di Venezia, as well as organising his first personal exhibition at the "Francesco Francia" Society. From 1931 he attended and exhibited at various sessions of the Rome Quadriennale.

In 1965, Pizzirani received the Gold Medal and the Certificate of Merit for Culture and the Arts, from the Italian Ministry of Public Education and several prizes from the Province of Bologna.

Pizzirani died in 1971, but even after his death, many of his paintings were exhibited at various posthumous personales and are currently on show at important galleries and museums.

Awards 
 — Italian Order of Merit for Culture and Art, on 2 June 1965.
 — Order of Merit of the Italian Republic, in Rome, 2 June 1969.

See also
Giorgio De Vincenzi
Cipriano Efisio Oppo
Roberto Melli
Scuola Romana
Avant-garde
Expressionism
Corrente di Vita
Classicism
Novecento Italiano
Figurative art
Representational Art

References

Bibliography
AA.VV., Guglielmo Pizzirani 1886-1971, Bologna, Associazione Bologna per le Arti, 2010.

External links
Pizzirani's work, on MutualArt. Retrieved 26 November 2012

20th-century Italian painters
Italian male painters
Painters from Bologna
Expressionist painters
1886 births
1971 deaths
20th-century Italian male artists